The Rt Hon. Sir Robert Clarkson Tredgold, KCMG, PC (2 June 1899 – 8 April 1977), was a Rhodesian barrister, judge and politician.

Early life
He was born in Bulawayo to Clarkson Henry Tredgold, the Attorney-General of Southern Rhodesia, and Emily Ruth (née Moffat), and was the grandson of the missionary John Moffat. He attended first Prince Edward School and then South African College Schools in Cape Town, South Africa. He was a Rhodes Scholar and read law at Hertford College.

In 1923 he was called to the bar at Inner Temple and then returned to Rhodesia to practice law.

Political career
In the 1934 general election, Tredgold was elected to the Southern Rhodesian Legislative Assembly seat of Insiza for the United Rhodesia Party of Godfrey Huggins. He rose quickly, becoming Minister of Justice and Defence in 1936, Minister of Justice, Defence and Air (1940–1943), Minister of Mines and Public Works (1938), and Minister of Native Affairs (1942–1943).

Later life and career
Tredgold resigned his offices and Legislative Assembly seat in 1943, to take up an appointment as a Judge of the High Court of Southern Rhodesia. In 1950, on the retirement of Chief Justice Sir Robert Hudson, he was appointed to succeed him as chief justice of the court. Serving until 1955, in this capacity he served as acting Governor of Southern Rhodesia from 21 November 1953 to 26 November 1954. In 1953, the University of the Witwatersrand, Johannesburg, awarded Tredgold the honorary degree of a Doctor of Laws (Hon LLD).

Tredgold was appointed the first Chief Justice of the Federal Supreme Court of the Federation of Rhodesia and Nyasaland in 1955. In this capacity he served as acting Governor of Southern Rhodesia from 21 November 1953 to 26 November 1954, and as acting Governor-General of the Federation of Rhodesia and Nyasaland from 24 January 1957 to February 1957. In November 1960 he resigned in protest from his Central African Federation position, criticising the actions authorised by Sir Edgar Whitehead to suppress black nationalist opposition to the Federation in Nyasaland and Northern Rhodesia, through the introduction of the Law and Order (Maintenance) Bill. Tredgold noted that the bill "outrages almost every basic human right and is, in addition, an unwarranted invasion by the executive of the sphere of the courts. These are the custodians of individual rights and are my special responsibility." 

Sir Robert Tredgold was named a Privy Counsellor in 1957. He retired to Marandellas with his second wife, Lady Margaret Tredgold. He published the book The Rhodesia That Was My Life in 1968.

Family
A widower in 1974, Tredgold married his second wife, Mrs. Margaret Helen Phear (née Baines; 1910-2012), a widow and mother of three children, originally from Aliwal North, South Africa. Together the couple researched the folklore of Rhodesia (formerly Southern Rhodesia) and published children's books based on them. They also researched edible plants, culminating in Food Plants of Zimbabwe, which she completed after his death and published in 1986.

A devout Roman Catholic, Lady Tredgold died in 2012 at age 102 in England, where she had relocated in 2004 due to the Mugabe government's policies. She was predeceased by one son, and survived by a second son and her daughter, with whom she lived in England.

Honours
Robert Clarkson Tredgold was appointed Companion of the Order of St Michael and St George in the 1943 New Year Honours. He was appointed a Knight Bachelor in the 1951 New Year Honours. He was appointed a KCMG in 1955.

References

|-

|-

|-

|-

|-

|-

1899 births
1977 deaths
People from Bulawayo
Members of the Inner Temple
Zimbabwean people of British descent
White Rhodesian people
Governors-General of the Federation of Rhodesia and Nyasaland
Members of the Privy Council of the United Kingdom
Members of the Legislative Assembly of Southern Rhodesia
Politicians from Cape Town
Rhodesian politicians
Alumni of Rondebosch Boys' High School
People associated with the University of the Witwatersrand
Place of death missing
Knights Bachelor
Knights Commander of the Order of St Michael and St George
Chief justices of Rhodesia
Zimbabwean Rhodes Scholars
Alumni of Hertford College, Oxford
Alumni of Prince Edward School
Defence Ministers of Zimbabwe